Sinéad Monica Harnett (born 12 October 1990) is an English singer/songwriter.

Career
Born to a Thai mother and an Irish father, Harnett grew up in Finchley, north London. She attended Arts University College Bournemouth, where she studied for a degree in acting and appeared in student productions of plays such as One Thousand and One Nights.

Harnett gained prominence as a singer in 2011 when, following an open request to her Twitter followers for suggestions and applicants, grime artist Wiley selected Harnett to feature on the single "Walk Away" from his album Chill Out Zone. In 2012, she was featured on the Disclosure track "Boiling" from their EP The Face. She released her debut single, "Got Me", in 2013 via Black Butter Records, and contributed songwriting and guest vocals to Rudimental's debut album, Home. She was also featured on Ryan Hemsworth's solo album Guilt Trips, on the opening track "Small + Lost", and provided uncredited vocals for Kidnap Kid's single "So Close".

Her debut EP, N.O.W., was released in August 2014 through 333 Records; it includes the single "No Other Way", which The Guardian named track of the week. Another track on the EP, "Paradise", received the same honour from The Huffington Post. Snakehips, who are featured on "No Other Way", featured Harnett on their single "Days with You". By late 2014, she was recording her debut album with producer Chris Loco for release on Virgin EMI Records, and was shortlisted for MTV UK's Brand New for 2015 award. The album was originally due for release in 2015 and also features contributions from James Fauntleroy, Chloe Martini, KOZ, TMS, and Two Inch Punch. Its first single, "She Ain't Me", was released in June 2015, followed by "Do It Anyway" in September 2015.

In early 2016, Harnett featured on the single "Never Say Never?" by rapper Nick Brewer. In August, she released the EP Sinead Harnett via Rinse FM; it features collaborations with GRADES, JD. Reid, Kaytranada, and Snakehips, and has produced the singles "If You Let Me" and "Rather Be with You".

Artistry

Harnett's musical influences include Mariah Carey, The Fugees, Whitney Houston, Lauryn Hill, Michael Jackson, Dizzee Rascal, Tina Turner, and Amy Winehouse. Billboard wrote in 2013 that "Harnett's rich, soulful voice and range has drawn comparisons to Adele, but her recordings are more experimental and contemporary—a brand of jazz-tinged, melodic electronic pop a bit reminiscent of Jessie Ware or Jhené Aiko."

Discography

Studio albums

EPs

Mixtapes

As lead artist

Guest appearances

References

1989 births
Living people
Alumni of Arts University Bournemouth
Black Butter Records artists
English dance musicians
English people of Irish descent
English people of Thai descent
British contemporary R&B singers
English soul singers
People from Finchley
Singers from London
Virgin Records artists
21st-century English women singers
21st-century English singers